Lionel Alex (born 12 April 1971 in Maravari Village, Vella La Vella Island, Western Province) is a Solomon Islands politician.

After graduating from the Solomon Islands College of Higher Education, he worked as a surveyor before entering politics. His career in national politics began when he was elected to Parliament as the member for South Vella La Vella in the August 2010 general election, standing as an independent candidate. He was then appointed Minister for Rural Development and Indigenous Affairs in Prime Minister Danny Philip's Cabinet. When Gordon Darcy Lilo replaced Philip as Prime Minister in November 2011, Alex retained his position in government.

References

1971 births
Living people
Members of the National Parliament of the Solomon Islands
People from the Western Province (Solomon Islands)
Government ministers of the Solomon Islands